Hugh Cairns may refer to:

 Hugh Cairns, 1st Earl Cairns (1819–1885), Lord Chancellor of the United Kingdom twice
 Sir Hugh Cairns (surgeon) (1896–1952), Australian surgeon
 Hugh Cairns (VC) (1896–1918), Canadian recipient of the Victoria Cross in 1918